Vikas Kumar "Vicky" Uppal (1 January 1986 – 30 June 2007) was a native and resident of India, said to be India's tallest man until his death on 30 June 2007 when he died during a failed brain tumor operation in Delhi.

Vicky Uppal was from the Rohtak district in the Indian state of Haryana. He was photographed for The Hindu in September 2006 at a rally held by the Indian National Lok Dal. He could have been considered the world's tallest living man, but the Guinness Book of Records has strict verification criteria; hence, Guinness did not measure Uppal. He also acted in a Bollywood movie, Rang De Basanti.

References

See also 
 List of tallest people
 Dharmendra Pratap Singh - tallest living Indian

1986 births
People with gigantism
2007 deaths
People from Rohtak district